The 25th Legislative Assembly of British Columbia sat from 1957 to 1960. The members were elected in the British Columbia general election held in September 1956. The Social Credit Party led by W. A. C. Bennett formed the government. The Co-operative Commonwealth Federation (CCF) led by Robert Strachan formed the official opposition.

Thomas James Irwin served as speaker for the assembly until April 1957; he was elected to the Canadian House of Commons later that year. Lorne Shantz replaced Irwin as speaker in 1958.

Members of the 25th General Assembly 
The following members were elected to the assembly in 1956:

Notes:

Party standings

By-elections 
By-elections were held to replace members for various reasons:

Notes:

Other changes 
John Melvin Bryan, Jr. becomes an Independent on February 3, 1958. He joins the Liberals on February 25, 1959.
Oak Bay (dec. Philip Archibald Gibbs March 1960)

References 

Political history of British Columbia
Terms of British Columbia Parliaments
1957 establishments in British Columbia
1960 disestablishments in British Columbia
20th century in British Columbia